Hubert and Takako (known as Hubert et Takako in French) is a French animated comedy series which was produced by Marc du Pontavice at Xilam and created and directed by Hugo Gittard and premiered in France on November 3, 2013 on Canal+. 78 episodes of 7 minutes are produced. The opening sequence is composed by Vincent Artaud.

Synopsis
Just about any pig would adapt pretty easily to the presence of a fly, but for Hubert, who aspires to becoming the archetype of the modern, clean-cut guy, Takako is messing up his plans! This deliciously out-of-control fly is that little glitch in Hubert's well oiled cogs. Worst, she accepts him just the way he is. But isn't that what true friendship is all about?

Characters
 Hubert (François-Xavier Demaison (French); Joe Ochman (English) (credited as B.J. Oakie)
 Takako (Charlotte Le Bon (French); Marieve Herington (English) (credited as Lindsay Torrence)

Episodes

 Fresh Air? Who Cares? (Ras le bol d’air), 
 Baby Sister (Tata Takako), 22 December 2013
 A Star is Born (Star de pub), 9 February 2014
 The Invisible Pig (Le cochon invisible), 16 February 2014
 Something Fishy (Mystère à la clé), 1 March 2014
 Space Cucumber (Concombre de l’espace), 9 April 2014
 Vote for Takako (Votez Takako), 31 May 2014
 Five Minutes of Fame (Question pour un cochon), 1 June 2014
 Pajama Party (Soirée pyjama), 29 June 2014
 Pig Tears (Larmes de cochon), 4 July 2014
 Takako, Are You Asleep? (Takako, tu dors ?)
 Scary Critters (Les petites bêtes ne mangent pas les grosses), 8 August 2014
 Paws Off My Raviolis! (Touche pas à mes raviolis), 19 September 2014
 One for Three and Three for All (Part 1) (Oh les amoureux ! (partie 1)), 4 October 2014
 One for Three and Three for All (Part 2) (Oh les amoureux ! (partie 2)), 6 October 2014
 Friendly Vampires (Hubert a les crocs), 8 November 2014
 Pepperoni and Brains (La science des pizzas), 15 November 2014
 Secret Agent Hubert (Un agent très spécial), 22 November 2014
 Couch Potato Traveler (L’aventure en pantoufles), 29 November 2014
 Clean Freak (Le fou du ménage), 6 December 2014
 Be Happy or Else! (Le bonheur à tout prix), 1 January 2015
 Cosmopig and Astrofly (Cosmocochon et Astromouche), 2 January 2015
 The Black Fly of the Family (La rebelle de la famille), 3 January 2015
 Treasure Hunt (Chasse au trésor), 4 January 2015
 You Drive Me Mad! (Conduite (mal) accompagnée), 5 January 2015
 Pedal for Your Life! (Beau comme un vélo), 6 January 2015
 Hide & Seek Guitar (Cache cache guitare), 7 January 2015
 Betcha Can't Do It! (Pas cap), 8 January 2015
 Play Ball! (Jour de match), 9 January 2015
 Misfortune Teller (Voyante extra (pas) lucid), 10 January 2015
 There's a Fly in My Soup! (Une mouche dans le potage), 11 January 2015
 Surprise, Surprise (Surprise surprise), 12 January 2015
 Me, Myself and I (Un ascenseur très particulier), 13 January 2015
 No pain, No Gain (100% muscle), 14 January 2015
 Saving Private Tatako (Il faut sauver le soldat Takako), 15 January 2015
 Fresh Water Pig (Cochon d’eau douce), 16 January 2015
 Retour à la nature, 17 January 2015
 The Haunted Portrait (Le tableau hanté), 18 January 2015
 Cheesy Girlfriend (Jennifromage)
 Cat from Outer Space (Le chaton venu d'ailleurs)
 Complètement gaga
 What a nose (Gros nez)
 Pig Collector (Cochon de collection)
 Peut mieux faire
 Trait de génie
 Mamie pas gâteau
 Les pirates du gazon
 Naufragés du 5ème étage
 Temps de cochon
 Écriture de cochon et pattes de mouche
 The Legend of King Hubert (La légende du roi Hubert)
 Voodoo on You (Le vaudou, c'est pas chou)
 Psycho Tango (Psychotango)
 Acrylic (Acrylique)
 It's No Piece of Cake (C'est pas du gâteau)
 Hell's Pig (Tatouages et pétarades)
 No Fraidy-Pig (Même pas peur !)
 Mouche est célèbre
 Raffle trouble (La tombola)
 Gala d'Olga (partie 1)
 Gala d'Olga (partie 2)
 Allô docteur
 Reach for the Moon (Décrocher la lune)
 Box trick (Mise en boîte)
 Que le meilleur gagne !
 Takako Pop
 Gare à l'ange gardien
 Double cochon
 T'as pas vu la gomme ?
 5th Floor Breakdown (Part 2) (Naufragés du 5ème étage (partie 2))
 Désaccord parental
 Á l'aveuglette
 La dernière fois
 Fans de série
 Un amour de robot
 Fais-moi rire
 Petit Hubert
 Retour vers le Hubert

References

External links
 Official website (in English)
 Hubert & Takako at the Big Cartoon DataBase

2013 French television series debuts
French children's animated comedy television series
Animated television series about pigs
Xilam
2010s French animated television series
Animated television series about insects